Tianzhou 1 was the debut mission of the Tianzhou-class uncrewed cargo spacecraft. It was developed as part of the crewed space program of China. Tianzhou means "heavenly vessel" in Chinese. On 20 April 2017, Tianzhou 1 was launched by rocket Long March 7 at China Wenchang Spacecraft Launch Site. It successfully docked with the Tiangong-2 space laboratory on 22 April 2017 at 12:16 (UTC+8). Tianzhou 1 was deorbited on 22 September 2017. It plunged into Earth's atmosphere and burned up after a set of braking maneuvers under ground control.

Spacecraft 

It used the first flight model of the Tianzhou. It is a Chinese automated cargo spacecraft developed from the Tiangong-1 to resupply its future modular space station.

Launch 
Tianzhou 1 launched successfully on 20 April 2017 at 7:41 pm local time, from the Wenchang space center. This marked the second time a Long March 7 had been used and the first time for a mission. Tianzhou-1 became the heaviest Chinese spacecraft ever launched, at that time.

Mission 
This mission demonstrated the Tianzhou spacecraft and its capabilities. It critically demonstrated propellant transfer for the Chinese space station, the last big hurdle for long-duration expeditions.
On April 22, 2017, Tianzhou 1 successfully docked with Tiangong 2 marking the first successful docking of a cargo vessel, and refuelling, with the orbiting space laboratory. It subsequently performed a second docking and refueling on June 15, 2017. After it coupled with Tiangong 2 for a period of 60 days, it decoupled and separated from the space laboratory and completed a three-month period of free flight at around 390 kilometres above the Earth, separately carrying out a range of science experiments. On September 12, 2017, Tianzhou 1 performed the third and final docking and refuel with Tiangong 2, with what is termed a fast docking which took 6.5 hours to complete. Previously the rendezvous and docking process took around two days, or 30 orbits.

References

External links 
 

Tiangong program
Tianzhou (spacecraft)
2017 in China
Spacecraft launched in 2017